Dynamix is an electronic and dance music duo consisting of producers Jeremy Skaller and Eddie Cumana.  Their first hit, "Don't Want Another Man" (featuring singer Tina Ann) hit #1 on the Billboard Hot Dance Music/Club Play chart in 2000.  They followed this with "Never Get Me", a #17 dance hit featuring singer Nina Eve.

In 2001, they remixed Toni Braxton's "Maybe" which achieved the #11 position on the Billboard Hot Dance Music/Club Play chart.

They went on to remix (alongside Junior Vasquez) Pink's "Stupid Girls" in 2006 which achieved the #19 position on the Billboard Hot Dance Music/Club Play chart.  Later that year, they released "Movin On" by Jason Walker which achieved the #7 position on the Billboard Hot Dance Music/Club Play chart.

See also
List of number-one dance hits (United States)
List of artists who reached number one on the US Dance chart

References

American electronic music groups
American dance music groups
American musical duos